The Beginning Point of the U.S. Public Land Survey is the point from which the United States in 1786 began the formal survey of the lands known then as the Northwest Territory, now making up all or part of Ohio, Indiana, Illinois, Michigan, and Wisconsin.  The survey is claimed to be the first major cadastral survey undertaken by any nation.  The point now lies underwater on the state line between Ohio and Pennsylvania.  Because it is submerged, a monument commemorating the point is adjacent to the nearest roadway and located on the state line between East Liverpool, Ohio and Ohioville, Pennsylvania.  The area around the marker was designated a National Historic Landmark in 1965.

Description and history
The monument commemorating the survey point is located on the north side of the Ohio River, on the south side of the road designated Ohio State Route 39 to the west and Pennsylvania Route 68 to the east.  It is near the three-way intersection of Ohio, Pennsylvania, and the northern tip of West Virginia, in both the Pittsburgh metropolitan area and the East Liverpool micropolitan area. It is inscribed "1,112 feet south of this spot was the point of beginning for surveying the Public Lands of the United States."

The Public Land Survey System of the United States was established by Congressional legislation in 1785, in order to provide an orderly mechanism for opening the Northwest Territory for settlement.  The ordinance directed the Geographer of the United States, Thomas Hutchins, to survey an initial east-west base line.  Hutchins began in 1786, using as his starting point a stake on north bank of the Ohio River placed by a 1785 survey team from the states of Virginia and Pennsylvania to fix their common north-south boundary (now the boundary between Pennsylvania and the northern tip of West Virginia). Hutchins' work, completed in 1787, established the Seven Ranges, with a baseline about  line. This survey is believed to be "the first mathematically designed system and nationally conducted cadastral survey in any modern country."

The monument was placed in 1881, and is maintained by the East Liverpool Historical Society. It was declared a National Historic Landmark in 1965 and designated as a National Historic Civil Engineering Landmark in 1985.

See also

Beginning Point of the Louisiana Purchase Survey
Ohio River Trail
List of National Historic Landmarks in Pennsylvania
List of National Historic Landmarks in Ohio
National Register of Historic Places listings in Beaver County, Pennsylvania
National Register of Historic Places listings in Columbiana County, Ohio

References

Initial points
National Register of Historic Places in Columbiana County, Ohio
National Register of Historic Places in Beaver County, Pennsylvania
National Historic Landmarks in Ohio
National Historic Landmarks in Pennsylvania
Borders of Ohio
Borders of Pennsylvania
Monuments and memorials in Ohio
Monuments and memorials in Pennsylvania
Tourist attractions in Beaver County, Pennsylvania
Historic Civil Engineering Landmarks
Historic surveying landmarks in the United States
Tourist attractions in Columbiana County, Ohio
1881 establishments in Pennsylvania
1881 establishments in Ohio